Hamdi Lembarki ( ‎; 1974 – 30 October 2005) was a Sahrawi man killed by Moroccan police after a demonstration in El Aaiun, during the 2005 Independence Intifada.

Death and funeral
Hamdi Lembarki was detained by members of the Groupes urbains de sécurité during a demonstration on the night of 29 October 2005 in El Aaiun. He died hours later in police custody. While at first the Moroccan authorities claimed that Lembarki had died from wounds from other protestors who were throwing stones, eyewitnesses and the Association marocaine des droits humains affirmed that police beat him to death in the street. In November, in an unprecedented movement in the territory, two Moroccan policemen were processed for alleged tortures to Lembarki, which finally caused him death.

Hamdi Lembarki was buried on the Gdeim Izik cemetery, in the outskirts of El Aaiun, on January 14, 2006. Hundreds of Sahrawis participated in the funeral, some waving Saharawi Republic/POLISARIO flags.

Finally, in June 2007, a Moroccan tribunal sentenced policemen Abderrahim Amssaued and Hassan Rochdi to 10 years in prison, for "involuntary homicide", but in March 2008 an appellate court reduced their sentences to two years and released the convicted policemen.

Legacy
A Spanish solidarity association with the Sahrawi people from Palafrugell, Gerona, had named itself Lembarki in his memory.

References

1974 births
2005 deaths
People from Laayoune
Date of birth missing
Victims of police brutality
Prisoners who died in Moroccan detention
Sahrawi prisoners and detainees
Protest-related deaths
Deaths by beating
Sahrawi Sunni Muslims
People killed by law enforcement officers